Elections to Mole Valley Council were held on 10 June 2004. One third of the council was up for election and the council stayed under no overall control. Overall turnout was 49.8%.

After the election, the composition of the council was:
Conservative 19
Liberal Democrat 17
Independent 5

Election result

Ward results

References
2004 Mole Valley election result
Ward results

2004
2004 English local elections
2000s in Surrey